St. Mary of the Immaculate Conception Church may refer to:

 St Mary Immaculate Church, Falmouth, Cornwall, United Kingdom
 St. Mary of the Immaculate Conception Church (Wilmington, Delaware), United States
 St. Mary of the Immaculate Conception Church (Morges, Ohio), United States
 St. Mary of the Immaculate Conception Roman Catholic Church (Fredericksburg, Virginia), United States

See also 
 St. Mary's Church (disambiguation)
 Church of the Immaculate Conception (disambiguation)